Glucose 1-dehydrogenase is a type of enzyme.

Glucose 1-dehydrogenase may specifically refer to:
Glucose 1-dehydrogenase (FAD, quinone)
Glucose 1-dehydrogenase (NAD+)
Glucose 1-dehydrogenase (NADP+)